Cahan is a commune in the Orne department in north-western France.

Population

See also
 Communes of the Orne department

References

Communes of Orne